Carex wahlenbergiana is a species of sedge that was first described by Francis Boott in 1860.

References

wahlenbergiana
Plants described in 1860
Taxa named by Francis Boott